The Scalloway Islands are in Shetland opposite Scalloway on south west of the Mainland. They form a mini-archipelago and include:

 Burra (two islands linked by bridge to each other and Trondra)
 East Burra (with Houss Ness)
 West Burra

 South Havra
 Little Havra
 Papa – belongs to Civil parish of Lerwick
 West Head of Papa (tidal)

The aforementioned islands were all part of the ancient civil parish of Burra, which was merged with Lerwick in 1891.

They are shown on coloured maps as part of Lerwick.

 Hildasay/Hildesay – belongs to Civil parish of Tingwall
 Langa – belongs to Civil parish of Tingwall
 Linga (not to be confused with numerous Shetland islands of the same name) – belongs to Civil parish of Tingwall
 Oxna – belongs to Civil parish of Tingwall
 Trondra (linked to Mainland, and Burra by bridge) – belongs to Civil parish of Tingwall
 St Ninian's Isle, connected to the Mainland by a tombolo, is not far to the south - belongs to Civil parish of Dunrossness

See also

 List of islands of Scotland

References

 
Landforms of Shetland
Archipelagoes of Scotland
Archipelagoes of the Atlantic Ocean